Mario Sebastián Ramírez (born May 18, 1992 in Salto, Uruguay) is an Uruguayan footballer currently playing for Cobreloa.

Teams
  Liverpool 2012
  Rentistas 2013–2016
  San Luis de Quillota 2016–2017
  Atenas de San Carlos 2018
  Deportes Copiapó 2018
  Cobreloa 2019
  CA Mannucci 2020
  Cobreloa 2021–present

References

External links
 
 
 

1992 births
Living people
Uruguayan footballers
Uruguayan expatriate footballers
Liverpool F.C. (Montevideo) players
C.A. Rentistas players
San Luis de Quillota footballers
Deportes Copiapó footballers
Chilean Primera División players
Primera B de Chile players
Expatriate footballers in Chile
Uruguayan expatriate sportspeople in Chile
Association football defenders
Footballers from Salto, Uruguay